Yu Shu-chen (born 25 January 1980) is a Taiwanese judoka. She competed in the women's extra-lightweight event at the 1996 Summer Olympics.

References

1980 births
Living people
Taiwanese female judoka
Olympic judoka of Taiwan
Judoka at the 1996 Summer Olympics
Place of birth missing (living people)
Judoka at the 1998 Asian Games
Asian Games competitors for Chinese Taipei
20th-century Taiwanese women